The 2016 Albany Great Danes football team represented the University at Albany, SUNY in the 2016 NCAA Division I FCS football season. They were led by Greg Gattuso, who was in his third season as head coach, and played their home games at Bob Ford Field at Tom & Mary Casey Stadium. The Great Danes were in fourth season as members of the Colonial Athletic Association. They finished the season 7–4, 4–4 in CAA play to finish in a tie for sixth place.

Schedule

Source: Schedule

Game summaries

at Buffalo

at Rhode Island

Holy Cross

Saint Francis (PA)

Richmond

at Maine

at Villanova

Elon

Delaware

at New Hampshire

Stony Brook

Ranking movements

References

Albany
Albany Great Danes football seasons
Albany Great Danes football